(born June 25, 1978 in Nagasaki, Nagasaki) is a former backstroke swimmer from Japan, who won the bronze medal in the 200m Backstroke at the 2000 Summer Olympics in Sydney, Australia.

References
 databaseOlympics
 Profile on FINA-site

1978 births
Living people
Japanese female backstroke swimmers
Olympic swimmers of Japan
Swimmers at the 1996 Summer Olympics
Swimmers at the 2000 Summer Olympics
Olympic bronze medalists for Japan
People from Nagasaki
Olympic bronze medalists in swimming
Asian Games medalists in swimming
Medalists at the 2000 Summer Olympics
Universiade medalists in swimming
Asian Games silver medalists for Japan
Asian Games bronze medalists for Japan
Swimmers at the 1994 Asian Games
Medalists at the 1994 Asian Games
Universiade gold medalists for Japan
Medalists at the 1997 Summer Universiade
Medalists at the 1999 Summer Universiade